John Harris (c. 1586 – 6 March 1657) of Hayne in the parish of Stowford in Devon and of St. Michael's Mount in Cornwall, was a Member of Parliament.

Origins
He was the eldest son and heir of Arthur Harris (1561-1628) of Hayne and of  Kenegie, Gulval, Cornwall, Sheriff of Cornwall in 1603 and Captain of St Michael's Mount in Cornwall, by his wife Margaret Davilles daughter of John Davilles of Marland in the parish of Petrockstowe, Devon.

Career
He matriculated at Exeter College, Oxford on 18 March 1603, aged 17  and was admitted at Lincoln's Inn on 10 February 1607, marked in the records as being "of Devon", when he commenced his training as a lawyer. Harris was elected as a Member of Parliament for Launceston, Cornwall, in 1621, for Bere Alston on 28 April 1640 (in the Short Parliament) and for Launceston again in 1641.

Marriages and children
He married twice:
Firstly to Florence Wyndham (1595-1630/1), a daughter of Sir John Wyndham (1558–1645) of Orchard Wyndham in the parish of Watchet, Somerset. She died aged 35 without children.
Secondly to Cordelia Mohun, a daughter of John Mohun, 1st Baron Mohun of Okehampton, by whom he had children:
Sir Arthur Harris, 1st Baronet (c.1650-1686) of Hayne, only son and heir, thrice a Member of Parliament for Okehampton in Devon.

Death and burial
Harris died at Hayne at the age of 70 and was buried at Lifton, near Hayne, where survives his monumental brass. His elaborate monument survives in Lifton Church, showing three kneeling figures, himself at right, his first wife Florence Wyndham at left, his father in the centre.

References

1580s births
1657 deaths
Members of the Parliament of England for Bere Alston
Alumni of Exeter College, Oxford
Members of Lincoln's Inn
English MPs 1621–1622
English MPs 1640 (April)
English MPs 1640–1648